The Final Revival of Opal & Nev is a 2021 historical fiction novel by Dawnie Walton.

Reception

Reviews 
The Final Revival Of Opal & Nev was well-received by critics, including starred reviews from Booklist, Library Journal, and Publishers Weekly.

Multiple reviewers highlighted aspects of the novel related to race and gender. Kirkus Reviews called the book an "intelligently executed love letter to Black female empowerment and the world of rock music," while Publishers Weekly called it "a firecracker," saying, "Walton pumps up the volume with a fresh angle on systemic racism and freedom of expression." Booklist said it is a "cinematic, stereophonic, and boldly imagined story of race, gender, and agency in art." NPR's Maureen Corrigan noted, "The Final Revival of Opal & Nev is itself anything but 'regular.' A deep dive into the recent past, [the novel] also simultaneously manages to be a rumination on up-to-the-minute themes like cultural appropriation in music, and the limits of white allyship." The Washington Post wrote, "It is refreshing to read a book that centers a Black woman who has this many layers, a book that seeks neither to save her from nor punish her for the flaws that make her human."

Reviewers also commented on the book's realism. Library Journal wrote, "The characters seem so real that readers will find themselves searching the internet, hoping to find that Opal and Nev are actual people. Walton has penned a true wonder of a debut novel, bringing real events into her story." Corrigan indicated that she "had to stop and double check to make sure that this wasn't a true account of a real-life rock duo from the 1970s." The New York Times Book Review said the book "feels truer and more mesmerizing than some true stories."

Also highlighted was Walton's writing style and the atypical format of the book. Entertainment Weekly explained, "Walton's debut novel uses oral history as the form for her kaleidoscopic tale, though she can hardly be contained by it. The book bursts with fourth wall breaks and clear-eyed takes on race, sex, and creativity that Walton unfurls in urgent, endlessly readable style." Library Journal said, "Walton has a true storytelling voice, and her writing is impeccable. The New York Times Book Review said the book is "[i]ngeniously structured."

Awards and honors 
In 2021, Booklist named one of the top ten debut novels of the year.

In 2022, Walton won the VCU Cabell First Novelist Award for The Final Revival of Opal & Nev.

References 

2021 American novels
Novels set in the 1970s
Audie Awards
English-language novels
Simon & Schuster books